Nine ships of the French Navy have borne the name Topaze, in honour of the gemstone Topaz:
 , a 26-gun frigate, lead ship of her class
 , a 32-gun 
 , a 44-gun frigate
 , a 2-carronade 
 , a 6-gun schooner 
 , a 2-gun schooner 
  (1891), a 6-gun 
  (1910), an 
 , an auxiliary ship

French Navy ship names